Yolande Turner, also known as Yolande Finch (12 December 1935 – 6 November 2003), was a British actress and screenwriter.

Born in South Africa as Yolande Eileen Turnbull, she was the second wife of actor Peter Finch, by whom she had two children, Samantha and Charles Peter. She died on 6 November 2003 in London, aged 67, from undisclosed causes.

Her film career included roles in Five Miles to Midnight (1962), Girl with Green Eyes (1964) and Come Back Peter (1969). On televison she appeared in The Avengers in the 1966 episode entitled "The Girl From Auntie". She also starred in Upstairs Downstairs (as Mrs Van Groeben), playing the part of a South African aristocrat.

References

External links

1935 births
2003 deaths
Actresses from London
British film actresses
British television actresses
South African expatriates in England
20th-century British actresses
20th-century English women
20th-century English people